DYAA-TV is a commercial television station owned by GMA Network Inc. Its transmitter is located at Brgy. Poblacion, Brooke's Point, Palawan.

References

See also
 List of GMA Network stations

GMA Network stations
Television channels and stations established in 2007
Television stations in Palawan